Blood rain is a phenomenon where blood is perceived to fall from the sky in the form of rain.

Blood Rain may also refer to:

 Blood Rain (film), a 2005 thriller film
 Blood Rain (novel), a 1999 crime novel

See also
BloodRayne, a 2002 video game and subsequent series
"Raining Blood", a song from the 1986 Slayer album Reign in Blood
Blood Reign: Curse of the Yoma, a Japanese manga by Kei Kusunoki
Red Rain (disambiguation)